Knud Adland (February 15, 1829 – May 5, 1912) was a member of the Wisconsin State Assembly.

Biography
Adland was born near Bergen in Hordaland, Norway. He came to America as a child with his family, settling in Illinois in 1837 and then moving to Racine County, Wisconsin in 1840. He married Phoebe (Drought) Adland (1834–1899), with whom he had eight children. The family settled in what is now North Cape, Wisconsin, where he was a merchant. He also served as local postmaster, justice of the peace, and chairman of the town board. He was elected a member of the Wisconsin State Assembly in 1879 as a Republican.

Adland died in Chicago, where he was living with one of his sons.

References

1829 births
1912 deaths
19th-century American merchants
19th-century American politicians
Norwegian emigrants to the United States
People from Racine County, Wisconsin
Republican Party members of the Wisconsin State Assembly